Hejnice is a town in Liberec District in the Liberec Region of the Czech Republic. It has about 2,700 inhabitants.

Administrative parts
The village of Ferdinandov is an administrative part of Hejnice.

Etymology
The original German name of the village Haindorf is based on the German Dorf im Haine, which means "village in the grove". The Czech name was derived from the German one and from háj, i.e. "grove".

Geography
It lies in the valley of the river Smědá under the northern slopes of the Jizera Mountains. The northernmost part of the municipal territory lies in the Frýdlant Hills.

The entire territory of Hejnice is situated in the Jizerské hory Protected Landscape Area. Half of the Czech part of the UNESCO World Heritage Site named Ancient and Primeval Beech Forests of the Carpathians and Other Regions of Europe is situated in the territory.

History
According to a legend, a pilgrimage church was founded here already in 1211. The first written mention of Hejnice is from 1381. In the 16th century, iron ore mines were opened. In 1692, count František Gallas established a Franciscan monastery, which helped the visibility of the village. In the 19th century, several textile factories were established in the village and its surroundings. The village of Hejnice was promoted to a town in 1917.

In 1938, Hejnice was annexed by Nazi Germany. From 1938 to 1945, it was administered as part of Reichsgau Sudetenland.

Sights
The former Franciscan monastery and its pilgrimage Church of the Visitation are the most valuable buildings in Hejnice. Today the monastery premises are used for cultural and social purposes and provide accommodation.

The Church of the Visitation was originally a small wooden church from the 14th century, which was gradually expanded. The most valuable object is a wooden Gothic sculpture of the Black Madonna from 1380. In front of the church stands the Marian column from 1695.

Notable people
Oskar Romm (1919–1993), German flying ace
Katharina Matz (1935–2021), German actress
Jürgen Kocka (born 1941), German historian

Twin towns – sister cities

Hejnice is twinned with:
 Łęknica, Poland

References

External links

Cities and towns in the Czech Republic
Populated places in Liberec District